The 1922 Montana football team represented the University of Montana in the 1922 college football season. They were led by first-year head coach John W. Stewart, played their home games at Dornblaser Field and finished the season with a record of three wins and four losses (3–4).

Schedule

References

Montana
Montana Grizzlies football seasons
Montana football